Perak Malay (Standard Malay: bahasa Melayu Perak; Jawi script: بهاس ملايو ڤيراق) is one of the Malay dialects spoken within the state of Perak, Malaysia. Although it is neither the official language nor the standard dialect in the whole state of Perak, its existence which co-exists with other major dialects in the state of Perak still plays an important role in maintaining the identity of Perak. In spite of the fact that there are five main dialects traditionally spoken in Perak, only one of which is intended by the name "Perak Malay". There are subtle phonetic, syntactic and lexical distinctions from other major Malay dialects. Perak Malay can be divided into two sub-dialects, Kuala Kangsar and Perak Tengah, named after the daerah (districts) where they are predominantly spoken.

Classification
Linguistically, the Malay dialects spoken in the state of Perak are diverse. In fact, there is still no definite classification of the type of Malay dialects used in Perak. Ismail Hussein (1973) classified the Malay dialects in Perak into five types segregated into five different areas. While Harun Mat Piah (1983) categorized them into six. Although Asmah Haji Omar (1985) divided the Malay dialects in Perak into five types, the specifications of the division did not coincide with that of Ismail's.

Distribution

Perak Malay is spoken throughout the whole state except in the northwestern parts of Perak (Kerian, Larut, Matang and Selama), and a few parts of Manjung district including Pangkor Island where the northern dialect is predominantly spoken.

In the northeastern part of Perak (Hulu Perak) and some parts of Selama and Kerian, the Malay people natively speak a distinct variant of Malay language which is most closely related to Kelantan-Pattani Malay and the Malay dialects of southern Thailand due to geographical borders and historical assimilation. This variant is occasionally classified as a sub-dialect of Yawi. The district of Hulu Perak once was ruled by the Kingdom of Reman. Reman was historically a part of Greater Pattani (which is now a province of Thailand) before gaining independence in 1810 from the Pattani Kingdom via a rebellion by the Royal Family.

In the southern parts of Perak (Hilir Perak and Batang Padang) and also in the districts of Kampar and Kinta and several parts of Manjung, the dialect is heavily influenced by southern Malay dialects of the peninsula such as Selangor, Malacca and Johore-Riau Malay and various languages of Indonesian archipelago namely Javanese, Banjar, Rawa, Mandailing and Buginese as a result of historical immigration, civil war such as Klang War and other inevitable factors.

Whilst there are many Malay dialects significantly found in Perak, all Malay dialectologists basically agreed that Perak Malay is spoken by the native Malay people who traditionally have long been subsisting along the riverine system of Perak which comprises Perak River valley and its vicinity except those at the upper stream. Historically, it was a tradition for the Malay peasants in Perak to settle along the Perak River. Royal residences also were built at various sites along the river basin, and there was never any attempt to move to another tributary.

Characteristics

Phonology

Open final syllables

Exception of this rule occurs for some words as shown in the table below. This exception is regarded as common amongst most Malay dialects in the peninsula.

Still and  all, diphthongization of monophthongs occurs in certain conditions instead. For instance, the final vowels sound /-i/ and /-u/ are articulated to some extent as diphthongs [-iy] and [-uw] respectively. The monophthongization patterns phonetically vary by the sub-dialects.

The pattern /-ai̯/ transformed to [-aː] is particularly restricted to some areas within the district of Perak Tengah. Typically in most villages in Parit and southward to Bota, this pattern is applied. While in the sub-districts of Kampung Gajah and northward to Lambor, the speakers tend to utter in the similar form as in Kuala Kangsar sub-dialect.

Closed final syllables
There is a phonological rule in Perak Malay that neutralizes the final nasals to alveolar nasal. The final nasals  and  phonetically exist in certain environments.

Rhoticity
Most of Malay dialects particularly in Malaysia are non-rhotic. Perak Malay is one of non-rhotic variants of Malay language and the 'r' is guttural. In Perak Malay, if the 'r' appears in the initial and middle position of a word, it will be pronounced as French 'r' specifically voiced uvular fricative, [ʁ] but if it comes in the final position of a word and in a postvocalic setting, it will be dropped or deleted and then substituted into an open vowel; usually 'o' by affecting the open vowel preceding it.

Vocabulary

Personal pronouns
Perak Malay differs lexically from Standard Malay for some personal pronouns. The suffix '-me' indicates plural pronoun. Possibly '-me' is derived from the word  that means 'all' in Malay.

Notes:
* Kuala Kangsar variant
** Influence of the northern dialect

Intensifiers
Instead of using '' or '' as intensifier for an adjective, Perak Malay speakers also use specific intensifiers for some adjectives.

Animals
Perak Malay also differs phonetically and lexically from Standard Malay for some animals.

Fruits and plants
Perak Malay has distinct names for specific fruits and plants. Some differ in pronunciation from Standard Malay.

References

Bibliography

 
 
 
 
 
 
 
 
 
 
 

Agglutinative languages
Malay dialects
Malay language
Languages of Malaysia
Perak
Malayic languages